Leeteuk (born Park Jeong-su; July 1, 1983) is a South Korean singer-songwriter and television host. He is the leader of the K-pop boy band Super Junior and its subgroups, Super Junior-T and Super Junior-H. He has hosted numerous television programs and award shows, and acted in several films and television dramas in cameo or supporting roles. He made his television debut with a bit part appearance in the drama All About Eve in 2000. He has since acted in Dream High (2011), All My Love For You (2011), My Bittersweet Life (2011), Salamander Guru and The Shadows (2012), Persevere, Goo Hae Ra (2015), Borg Mom (2017), Secret Queen Makers (2018) and Work Later, Drink Now (2021).

After debuting with the boy band Super Junior in 2005, he participated in several Super Junior–centric television shows; Super Junior Show (20052006), Super Adonis Camp (2006), Super Junior Mini-Drama (2006), Super Junior's Music Diary (2007), and television dramas; Mystery 6 (2006) and Super Junior Unbelievable Story (2008). He made his film debut by acting in Attack on the Pin-Up Boys (2007) which featured all members of the boy band except Kyuhyun who was injured. He participated in the concert documentary films I Am (2012) and SM Town The Stage (2015), which were screened in selected cinemas. He became a radio DJ through the radio programs Leeteuk's Music Show which aired on TBS in 2006 and Super Junior Kiss the Radio (Sukira) which was aired on KBS Cool FM from 2006 until 2011, and for a few months in 2016.

He started his career as a host in the weekly music show M! Countdown from 2005 until 2008. He rose to prominence after co-hosting Strong Heart from 2009 until 2012, which led him to win the Best Newcomer Award in the variety show category at the 3rd SBS Entertainment Awards. He also hosted Star King (20112012) and participated in the third season of the reality show We Got Married (2012) until he enlisted in the military in October 2012 as an active duty soldier. While in the military, he participated in the musical theater The Promise, which was produced by the Ministry of National Defense to commemorate the 60th anniversary of the Korean War armistice. He won the Newcomer Award at the 7th Daegu International Musical Festival for his role as Miss Kim in the musical. He was also chosen to host the 2013 Military Service Award, an annual award ceremony to honour military personnel, during his enlistment.

After he was discharged from the military in 2014, he hosted the biannual celebrity sports competition, Idol Star Athletics Championships. He has hosted the program nine times; twice in 2015, 2018 and 2019, and once in 2016, 2020 and 2021. He started hosting I Can See Your Voice in 2015, which has since grown into a global television franchise and was adapted in other regions and languages. He is also the host of the longest-running South Korean cooking show The Best Cooking Secrets from 2017 until 2020, which airs on the educational channel EBS. Besides television works, he frequently hosts South Korean awards ceremony such as the Golden Disc Awards (2012, 2015 and 2016), Gaon Chart Music Awards (20152018, and 20202021), and Asia Artist Awards (20162021). He has hosted multiple concert events such as the Asia Song Festival (20142018), Dream Concert (20152017, and 20192020), and 2018 Winter Olympics promotional concerts; K-Drama Festa in Pyeongchang (2017) and Dream Concert in Pyeongchang (2017).

Films

Television shows

Web series

Radio shows

Stage

Others
Leeteuk also hosted the following events:

See also 
 Super Junior filmography

Explanatory notes

References

South Korean filmographies